Stephen John Kalinich (born 1942) is an American poet mostly known for his songwriting collaborations with Brian and Dennis Wilson of the Beach Boys. In 1969, he recorded his only album, A World of Peace Must Come, with production by Brian Wilson. It was unreleased until 2008.

Biography
Kalinich was born in Endicott, New York. He drifted from the East Coast to California in the mid-1960s, transferring from Syracuse University's Harpur College (now Binghamton University) to UCLA. At Syracuse, he was friends with singer-songwriter Felix Cavaliere, and they both were in the Sigma Phi Epsilon fraternity.

Immersing himself in the anti-war movement, he began working the LA scene as a poet and performer, appearing at venues such as The Troubadour (Los Angeles). At an early age, he began writing poems and articles about World Peace. He has said, "Very early I wanted to be an influence for peace and good in the world."

An album, Leaves of Grass, co-written with Kalinich's early collaborator Mark Buckingham, was recorded in 1966 but radio stations would not play it, wrongly assuming it was about marijuana. At the time, Kalinich was studying and working at a gas station. As the hippie movement snowballed, the Doors and Love were exposing the dark underbelly of the 1960s dream. Kalinich's poetry rests on that pivot point.

Poetry
Kalinich's works include:
America
America, I Know You
A World of Peace Must Come
Be Still
Bring in the Poets
Candy Face Lane
If You Knew
You Are the Trigger

He is also a spoken word performer often backed by original music. Titles include:
The Magic Hand
Galactic Symphonies

Music collaborations
While under contract as an artist signed to the Beach Boys' Brother Records, Kalinich co-wrote several songs released by the group including "All I Want to Do", "Be Still", "Little Bird", and "A Time to Live in Dreams" with Dennis Wilson.

Kalinich is the lyricist and co-publisher for Brian Wilson's duet with Paul McCartney "A Friend Like You", on Wilson's 2004 solo album release, Gettin' In Over My Head.

Kalinich also has collaborated with a number of recording artists, performers, musicians, and composers including P.F. Sloan, Art Munson, Ken Hirsch, Randy Crawford, Mary Wilson of the Supremes, Fernando Perdomo, Odyssey, Clifton Davis, Chris M. Allport, and Diana Ross.

Tribute albums
In 2016, Al Gomes conceived and co-produced, along with his partner Connie Watrous and Grammy Award-winning Beach Boys producer, archivist and historian Alan Boyd, a spoken word tribute CD called "The Works of Stephen J. Kalinich - Be Still". The collection included performances of Kalinich's poetry by Beach Boys founder Brian Wilson; actors Stacy Keach, James Michael Tyler, Ralph Brown, Jenny Jules, Rose Weaver, and Samaire Armstrong; Grammy Award nominee Lisa Haley; author and musician Tracy Landecker; along with Gomes, Watrous, and Boyd. The Recording Academy placed the album on its Official 58th Annual Grammy Awards Ballot for Best Spoken Word Album. Gomes said, "This has turned out to be one of the best projects I've ever worked on. What an incredible gathering of talent. This album is a passionate meditation on the journey of life, and also on how poetry and art affect that journey, both from the author's and the receiver of the art's point of view. Thanks to all who gave of themselves - the artists, engineers, and studios - and to all those who listen." Watrous added, "It aligned with the stars so quickly and everyone involved came into it with a beautiful spirit and worked so hard to make it happen with the purest of hearts."

In 2020, Al Gomes and Connie Watrous were tasked with the mission of re-releasing the musical tribute compilation to Kalinich called "California Feeling: The Songs of Stephen Kalinich and Friends" as a four-volume set. Gomes and Watrous oversaw everything from the song sequences, the artwork, and the full worldwide release.

"California Feeling" features Beach Boys classics performed by Beach Boys founding members Brian, Dennis and Carl Wilson's children, family members, touring members, longtime friends, and more, and each of the four volumes tells a unique story.

Artists on the collection include Beach Boy David Marks, Grammy Award Nominees Carnie Wilson and Wendy Wilson (Wilson Phillips), The Supremes founding member Mary Wilson, Neil Innes (Monty Python, The Rutles), Stax Records session guitarist, songwriter, and producer Steve Cropper, The Smithereens member Dennis Diken, pop singer Evie Sands, singer-songwriter P.F. Sloan, Alan Boyd, Brian Wilson's touring musical director Probyn Gregory, and Grammy Award Nominee, producer, and songwriter David Courtney.

Journalist and music critic Brent Wootten (Salon) chose the compilation as one of his 'Top 20 Albums of 2020' : "I was delighted that so many of my favorites artists treated us to their best work in years (Lucinda Williams, Rufus Wainwright, Bob Dylan, Paul McCartney, The Flaming Lips, Shelby Lynne, Jeff Tweedy, and Fleet Foxes), while 'California Feeling: The Songs of Stephen Kalinich and Friends Volume One' - a tribute to the poet and Beach Boys collaborator - offers contemporary takes on the classic California sound."

References

External links
Official website
MySpace
Light In The Attic Records
Stephen Kalinich, Biography video clip on Vimeo
Spoken Word Tribute Album: The Works of Stephen J. Kalinich - Be Still
Musical Tribute Album: California Feeling : The Songs of Stephen J. Kalinich and Friends - Volume One-Four - Spotify
Musical Tribute Album: California Feeling : The Songs of Stephen J. Kalinich and Friends - Volume One-Four - YouTube

Living people
Songwriters from New York (state)
People from Endicott, New York
Harpur College alumni
University of California, Los Angeles alumni
1942 births
Light In The Attic Records artists